Quill was a rock band that played extensively throughout New England, New York, and the mid-Atlantic states in the late 1960s, and gained national attention by performing at the original Woodstock Festival in 1969. The band was founded by two singer-songwriters and brothers from the Boston area, Jon and Dan Cole.

Early days
The basic line up included Roger North on drums, Norm Rogers on guitar and Phil Thayer on keyboard, saxophone, and flute, with Jon on bass and Dan doing the bulk of the lead vocals. However, as explained in detail below, instrumental flexibility was one of the band's most unusual features. Out of this combination, and with the Cole brothers' focus on original songwriting came 'Quill', which was then signed as a group to Amphion Management.  The band spent 1967, 1968 and 1969 regularly playing rock venues in Boston, Providence, and New York, as well as many other smaller markets around the Northeast. Though Quill rarely played outside of their region, the show made it as far west as Aspen, Colorado.

Success
Quill opened for The Jeff Beck Group, The Who, The Kinks, Deep Purple, Buddy Guy, Blue Cheer, Sly and the Family Stone, Grateful Dead, Janis Joplin, and the comedian Steve Martin.. An appearance in the early summer of 1969 at Steve Paul's Scene in New York City resulted in Quill being invited to play at the Woodstock Festival.  That night at the club also featured the first introduction of Johnny Winter to the NYC record industry crowd.

Aside from the basic roles of each member of the band, the band was able to mount a variety of instrumental and vocal configurations to play specific songs. Roger North anchored the band on the drums and percussion.  The other members of the band would often switch instruments to create different sounds and effects. Jon and Norm both sang some lead vocals while Dan might be playing guitar or trombone, forming a small horn section with Phil on sax; Jon would sometimes switch to guitar with Norm playing bass; Norm was known to trot out his cello on occasion; Phil even played bass while Norm and Dan played guitar and Jon sang; everyone participated in group vocals as needed. Though Dan was the primary front man for the band on stage, its ability to effectively and frequently change focal points and configurations was well-suited to the broad song writing ambitions of the Coles, who were responsible for almost all of the band's material.

Quill's music was eclectic, social commentary, sometimes poetic, sometimes ironic, merged with very unusual, at times nearly atonal scales.  The Cole brothers were hoping to make their audiences think, even while the music was being enjoyed. A local reviewer likened the band's music to a modern-day Threepenny Opera.

In addition to its original material, Quill made its reputation on performance art by drawing the audience into the music. The band handed out rhythm instruments and exhorted the crowds to a near riotous dance frenzy.

Woodstock

At Woodstock, in addition to playing the main festival stage on Saturday, Quill spent the week preceding the festival living at the setup crew's camp at a nearby motel, providing  entertainment for the stage crew, hog farmers and festival workers. Quill was also hired by festival promoters to play a series of goodwill concerts at nearby state prisons, mental institutions and halfway houses as a gesture to assuage community concerns about the upcoming festival. 

Seeing the market potential of the buzz that the band had already created, and with the band's upcoming appearance at Woodstock, Ahmet Ertegün (president of Atlantic Records) agreed to sign Quill in the summer of 1969 to the Cotillion label.

At the festival, after relentless, torrential rain all Friday and through the night, the skies cleared just before the band was to play. On a still-soaking stage, but under a beaming sun, the band played a 40-minute set of four songs ("They Live the Life", "That's How I Eat", "Driftin'", and "Waiting For You") and was received enthusiastically by the 400,000-person throng. Because the band appeared first on Saturday, and with the disarray caused by the rain, Quill missed a key opportunity to appear in the Woodstock film, though this was the original intent of Paret and the band. The band had indeed been filmed, but a glitch caused the audio and film to not be synchronized properly. This rendered the footage unusable for the now-famous film that made so many acts into household names. The problem was fixed in time for Santana, the next band up, whose appearance in the film sealed their later success.

Shortly after the festival, Quill self-produced and then released its first Cotillion album, which made some impact but did not gain national attention. The fact that the Quill footage could not be used for the Woodstock movie seriously disappointed Ertegün and the band's record was never actively promoted, even though over the years it has attained some cult status.

After Woodstock
Jon Cole, who was one of the driving creative forces in the band, left several months after the album release to pursue other production projects in which he had an interest. With the assistance of New York producer Tony Bongiovi, the other four members composed enough material to produce and record a second album for Cotillion, but which the label chose not to release. The remaining four disbanded Quill late in the spring of 1970.

Jon Cole spent a couple of years more in the music world associated with Andy Pratt (known for his hit Avenging Annie) and Jimmy Thompson, a popular singer-songwriter/guitarist from Boston. He went on to form Mechania, a groundbreaking company focused on teaching customers how to fix their own cars, and later moved to Hawaii where he became an expert in off-grid power alternatives. Cole now heads a company, Light on the Earth Systems, devoted to the spread and worldwide adoption of solar power.

Dan Cole later ran Intermedia Sound Studios, Boston's first 16-track recording studio. He also produced many local acts and multimedia soundtracks, including that of the first US laser light show, Lovelight, which had a long, successful run at Boston's Hayden Planetarium. He started his own production company, Dan Cole Productions, which managed and produced several music acts from the Boston area, including The American Standard Band (ASB), The Johnson Brothers and Jon Butcher. Cole arranged, through Michael Lang, then Joe Cocker's manager, for ASB to become Joe's band for a series of international tours and one album. He signed an independent production agreement with Island Records to produce ASB, who recorded two records with Island. Maurice Johnson later became the manager and producer of New Kids on the Block. Jon Butcher became known for his unique guitar, vocal and songwriting style, with several moderate hits. In the early 1980s, Dan Cole left the music business to pursue a career in the high-tech production hardware/software business, spending 12 years with Sony Professional Products Group. He left the corporate world to become a private investor and management consultant, and he still writes and produces his own material in his digital studio and is currently working on an album for general release.

After Quill disbanded, Roger North had a run as the drummer for the popular folk artist Odetta, and then ended up joining the post-Easy Rider version of Holy Modal Rounders, moving to Oregon with Steve Weber and the rest of the band (save Peter Stampfel, who remained in New York). He continued to perform with the HMR well into the 1980s, although he missed the opportunity to record with the band on what may be one of their best remembered efforts, Have Moicy!, a 1975 collaboration with Michael Hurley and Jeffrey Fredrick and the Clamtones. Roger went on to design the unique North Drums, still favored by some drummers lucky enough to have purchased a kit. He currently lives in Portland, Oregon and plays in the Freak Mountain Ramblers.

Discography
Quill (1970)

References

1967 establishments in Massachusetts
American progressive rock groups
Musical groups disestablished in 1970
Musical groups established in 1967
Musical groups from Boston
Musical quintets
Psychedelic rock music groups from Massachusetts